Lena Beach is a populated place in Juneau, Alaska, United States.

Demographics

Lena Beach first appeared on the 1940 & 1950 U.S. Census as an unincorporated village. In 1970 it was listed under Lena Cove. The same year, all places with Juneau Borough were consolidated into the city of Juneau.

References

Populated coastal places in Alaska on the Pacific Ocean
Populated places in Juneau, Alaska